John Raymond Gaydos (born August 14, 1943) is an American prelate of the Roman Catholic Church.  He served as bishop of the Diocese of Jefferson City in Missouri from 1997 to 2017.

Biography

Early years 
John Gaydos was born on August 14, 1943, in St. Louis, Missouri, to George and Carrie (née Lee) Gaydos. He graduated from St. Agnes School in 1957, then entered St. Louis Preparatory Seminary in St. Louis.  In 1961, Gaydos entered Cardinal Glennon College at Kenrick-Glennon Seminary in Shrewsbury, Missouri.

In 1965, Gaydos entered the Pontifical North American College and the Pontifical Gregorian University, both in Rome.  He obtained his Bachelor of Sacred Theology degree in dogmatic theology in 1969.

Priesthood 
On December 20, 1968, Gaydos was ordained to the priesthood for the Archdiocese of Saint Louis by Bishop Francis Reh in St. Peter's Basilica in Rome.

After returning to Missouri, Gaydos was assigned as associate pastor of St. Joseph Parish in Manchester, Missouri, until 1974.  He was then transferred to be associate pastor at St. Cecilia Parish in St. Louis, serving there until 1977. Gaydos was appointed as priest-secretary to Cardinal John  Carberry and as vice-chancellor of St. Louis from 1977 to 1981.  He then became secretary to Archbishop John May and full chancellor until 1990. Gaydos became pastor of St. Gerard Majella Parish in Kirkwood, Missouri in 1990, and vicar general of the archdiocese on February 14, 1996.

Bishop of Jefferson City 
On June 25, 1997, Pope John Paul II appointed Gaydos as the third bishop of the Diocese of Jefferson City. He was consecrated on August 27, 1997, by Archbishop Justin Rigali, with Bishop Michael McAuliffe and Archbishop Oscar Lipscomb serving as co-consecrators, at the Cathedral of Saint Joseph in Jefferson City.

Within the United States Conference of Catholic Bishops (USCCB). Gaydos served as chairman of the Committee on Priestly Life and Ministry, and was a member of the Ad Hoc Committee on Sexual Abuse, Administrative Committee, and Committee for Communications.

O'Connell sex abuse case 
On March 19, 2001, Gaydos and the diocese were sued by a former student at St. Thomas Aquinas Preparatory Seminary in Hannibal, Missouri.  The plaintiff claimed that Bishop Anthony J. O'Connell, then rector at the seminary, had sexually exploited him. In May 2002, facing declining enrollment at the seminary and pending lawsuits, Gaydos closed it.

In March 2002, it was revealed that the diocese had made a secret settlement of $125,000 in 1996 to a former seminarian who claimed by have been sexually abused by O'Connell in 1969 at the seminary.  In 1988, O'Connell was named bishop of the Diocese of Palm Beach; it is unknown if Gaydos had informed Pope John Paul II about the O'Connell settlement before he appointed O'Connell as bishop.  In 2002, O'Connell admitting abusing two boys at the seminary and resigned as bishop of Palm Beach.

Other sexual abuse cases 
In 2003, Gaydos and the diocese were named in a sexual abuse lawsuit by a Missouri man.  The plaintiff alleged that Gary Pool and Kevin Clohessy, two priests in the Diocese, had sexually abused him for most of his childhood.

On September 3, 2015, the diocese settled for $40,000 a long-standing sexual abuse claim by David Clohessy, the brother of Keven Clohessy, against John Whiteley, a diocese priest.  Clohessy had sued the diocese in 1991, claiming that Whitely, then a pastor at St. Pius X Parish in Moberly, Missouri, had sexually abused him.  Clohessy's case was dismissed in 1993 due to the Missouri statute of limitations.  However, Clohessy renewed his claim in 2015 and the diocese decided that it was credible.

Retirement 
In 2017, Gaydos sent a letter of resignation to Pope Francis, asking for early retirement due to health reasons. These were later described as hypertension, arterial fibrillation, and the need for heart valve replacement.  The pope accepted his resignation on November 21, 2017.

References

External links

Roman Catholic Diocese of Jefferson City Official Site
United States Conference of Catholic Bishops
Missouri Catholic Conference

Episcopal succession

1943 births
Living people
20th-century Roman Catholic bishops in the United States
21st-century Roman Catholic bishops in the United States
Clergy from St. Louis
Kenrick–Glennon Seminary alumni
Pontifical Gregorian University alumni
Roman Catholic Archdiocese of St. Louis
Roman Catholic bishops of Jefferson City